Southern Africans in the United States of America are Americans with ancestry from Southern Africa. They include:

Angolan Americans
Malawian Americans
Namibian Americans
Zambian Americans
Motswana Americans
South African Americans
Zimbabwean Americans
Mozambican Americans
Basotho Americans
Comorians Americans
Malagasy Americans
Seychellois Americans
Tanzanian Americans
 Swazi Americans

See also
Southern Africa